Flight 857 may refer to

All Nippon Airways Flight 857, hijacked on 21 June 1995
Eiseley's Flight 857, a 1977 poem by Loren Eiseley

0857